Lechmere is a surname. Notable people with the surname include:

 Lechmere baronets
 Sir Anthony Lechmere, 1st Baronet (1766–1849)
 Sir Edmund Lechmere, 3rd Baronet (1826–1894)
 Anthony Lechmere (MP) (1674–1720), English Member of Parliament.
 Charles Allen Lechmere (1849–1920), English meat cart driver suspected of being Jack the Ripper
 Edmund Lechmere, several individuals
 Kate Lechmere (1887–1976), British cubist painter
 Nicholas Lechmere, several individuals
 William Lechmere (1752–1815), officer in the Royal Navy

Notable people with Lechmere as a forename or middle name include:

 Edmund Lechmere Charlton (1789–1845), British politician
 Lechmere Guppy (1836–1916), British-born naturalist, namesake of the guppy fish
 Lechmere Thomas (1897–1981), senior British Army officer